Barboursville is the name of several places in the United States of America:

 Barboursville, Virginia
 Barboursville, West Virginia
 Barboursville (James Barbour) the Virginia home of James Barbour
 Barboursville Vineyards a winery located in Orange County, Virginia

See also
Barbourville (disambiguation)